The Belgian railway line 26 is a railway line connecting Brussels to Halle in Belgium. It first opened on July 19, 1926, between Schaarbeek and  Watermael railway stations. The line was completed on January 3, 1930. It was conceived as a circumvention of Brussels before the North–South connection existed, which opened only in 1952.

Today all passenger trains using the line travel from Vilvoorde on a branch line called 26/1 and not from Schaarbeek, to various destinations South of Brussels. The line carries (parts of) several services of the GEN/RER: S4, S5, S7, S9. Some of these use the Schuman-Josaphat tunnel, which branches off just South of Meiser station.

The line serves the following stations:
 Schaarbeek
 Haren
 Bordet
 Evere
 Schaarbeek-Josaphat
 Meiser
 Merode
 Etterbeek-Cinquantenaire
 Delta
 Boondael
 Vivier d’Oie / Diesdelle
 Saint-Job
 Moensberg
 Beersel
 Huizingen
 Halle

Schaarbeek-Josaphat is no longer an operational station, it was a freight yard very near the present Evere railway station.
Etterbeek-Cinquantenaire was also a freight station, it is now closed and (mostly) filled in.

References

26
26
Railway lines opened in 1926
Standard gauge railways in Belgium